"Will I Ever" is the third single release by Dutch Eurodance group Alice Deejay. Released in May 2000 as the third single from Who Needs Guitars Anyway?, the song was commercially less successful than the band's previous two singles, "Better Off Alone" and "Back in My Life", but it managed to reach the top 10 in Ireland, the Netherlands, Romania, Sweden, and the United Kingdom.

Chart performance
"Will I Ever" charted within the top 10 in Ireland, Romania, Sweden, the United Kingdom, and the band's native Netherlands. In the UK, where the song was released on 3 July 2000, it reached number seven on the UK Singles Chart but charted higher in Scotland, reaching number two on that region's chart, ensuring the band's first three singles all reached the top two. At the end of 2000, it came in at number 97 on the UK's year-end chart. In Ireland, the song was the band's final top-30 hit, reaching number eight.

In the rest of Europe, the single fared well, reaching the top 40 in Flanders, Denmark, France, Germany, Norway, and Switzerland. On the Eurochart Hot 100, it peaked at number 18. Outside the continent, the song did not garner success in the United States, but it did manage to find some popularity in Canadian dance clubs, reaching number 24 on Canada's RPM Dance Top 40. It was also moderately successful in Australia, peaking at number 65 on the ARIA Singles Chart.

Music video
A music video was made for the song. It features Alice Deejay singer Judith Anna Pronk in three different roles: a singer-dancer, a security guard, and a Greek woman.

Synopsis
During the first part, it features Pronk and Alice Deejay dancers (Mila Levesque and Angelique Versnel) in the hallways of an empty, white building on a stormy night. Pronk, as a security guard, also roams around the area. She reaches a painting depicting a Greek woman, who is also Pronk, and stops to look at it, realising the resemblance between the two of them. The figure in the portrait blinks, and the guard steps inside. The next part of the video features many people dressed in ancient Greek apparel dancing in a temple with a statue; Pronk and her dancers are also there. The security guard is then shown arriving at a restroom. She sings next to a mirror as the Greek woman admires a man and feeds him grapes. As the guard exits the restroom, all the Greeks feed each other grapes and other fruits. In the final section of the video, Pronk sings and dances with her dancers. The video ends at the stormy building, showing the painting the security guard looked at previously, with Pronk inside now still.

Track listings

Dutch and French CD single
 "Will I Ever" (Hitradio mix) – 3:16
 "Will I Ever" (Dutchforce remix) – 7:21

Dutch maxi-CD single
 "Will I Ever" (Hitradio mix) – 3:16
 "Will I Ever" (Hitradio XL) – 5:12
 "Will I Ever" (Dutchforce remix) – 7:21
 "Will I Ever" (E-Craig Clubmix) – 7:00
 "Will I Ever" (Pronti & Kalmani remix) – 7:20

UK CD1
 "Will I Ever" (Hitradio mix) – 3:14
 "Will I Ever" (Hitradio XL) – 5:26
 "Back in My Life" (Pronti & Kalmani club dub) – 6:06
 "Will I Ever" (enhanced video)

UK CD2
 "Will I Ever" (E-Craig Clubmix) – 7:00
 "Will I Ever" (Pronti & Kalmani remix) – 6:19
 "Will I Ever" (Dutchforce remix) – 6:23

UK cassette single
 "Will I Ever" (Hitradio mix) – 3:14
 "Will I Ever" (Hitradio XL) – 5:26
 "Back in My Life" (Pronti & Kalmani club dub) – 6:06

Canadian maxi-CD and 12-inch single
 "Will I Ever" (Pronti & Kalmani XL version) – 5:27
 "Will I Ever" (E-Craig club remix) – 7:00
 "Will I Ever" (Pronti & Kalmani remix) – 7:18
 "Will I Ever" (Dutchforce instrumental remix) – 7:19

Australian and New Zealand maxi-CD single
 "Will I Ever" (Hitradio edit) – 3:16
 "Will I Ever" (Dutch Force remix) – 7:21
 "Will I Ever" (Pronti & Kalmani X1 version) – 5:26
 "Will I Ever" (E-Craig club remix) – 7:00
 "Will I Ever" (Pronti & Kalmani remix) – 7:17

Credits and personnel
Credits are lifted from the Dutch CD single liner notes.

Studio
 Recorded at Kamo Studio 1 (The Hague, Netherlands)

Personnel
 Pronti and Kalmani – writing, production
 Danski and DJ Delmundo – executive production
 Shop Around! – graphic design
 Claudine Grin – photography

Charts

Weekly charts

Year-end charts

Certifications

Release history

Notes

References

External links
 

2000 singles
2000 songs
Alice Deejay songs
English-language Dutch songs
Positiva Records singles